RePOP is a load-balancing proxy server specific to the POP3 protocol.  It operates by answering the initial POP3 handshake and authentication request from a POP3 client.  RePOP obtains the username from the USER request from the POP3 client, and then looks for the location of the user's home POP3 server in a database. RePOP then initiates a connection to the requested user's home POP3 and reissues the USER request to the POP3 server. A standard proxy connection is connected through the RePOP server directly from the POP3 client to the user's home POP3 server for the remainder of the POP3 session.

History 
RePOP was initially conceptualized and developed by Patrick Tiquet at JPS.net Internet Services in 1997.  Tiquet continued to oversee development and deployment into the JPS.net e-mail system until his departure from JPSnet in 1999. RePOP continued to serve as an integral part of JPS.net's mail system through their acquisition by Onemain.com and eventually Earthlink.  RePOP was retired from use by Earthlink.net when e-mail was migrated to a new e-mail system. 

Email